Reverse flush toilet, also known as a washout toilet, is a type of flush toilet containing a shelf which holds the excrement out of the water until the flush. This could be to make inspection easier, to reduce splashing, or just tradition. It facilitates taking a stool sample. The design greatly increases associated odor and requires a brushing after every use. The design is common in Germany and the Netherlands.

See also 
 Washdown toilet
 Western toilet, a toilet designed to be used sitting

Toilet types